Andrew Sharp may refer to:

Andrew Sharp (trade unionist) (1841–1919), British trade unionist
Andrew Peacock, also known as Andrew Sharp Peacock,  (born 1939), Australian politician